Iran's annual Fajr International Film Festival, or Fajr Film Festival (little: FIFF), has been held every February and April in Tehran since 1982. The festival is supervised by the Ministry of Culture and Islamic Guidance. It takes place on the anniversary of the 1979 Islamic Revolution. The awards are the Iranian equivalent to the American Academy Awards.

The festival has been promoted locally and internationally through television, radio and webinars; speakers have come from the United States, the United Kingdom, and Germany. 

Organizations contributing to the event have included the Farabi Cinema Foundation, Iran film foundation, Press TV, HispanTV and Iran's multi-lingual film channel IFilm. From 2015, the festival has been separated into a national festival in February, which is notable for premieres of the most important domestic movies, and an international one, held in April.

Eligibility

Entries into the International Competition section must not have premiered in Central Asia, Caucasia and Anatolia (with the exception of the country of origin), or the Middle East to be considered. Films entered into the competitive sections must have completion dates in the years 2019-2020, while Popular Genre Films, and Docs in Focus, and Special Screenings must have completion dates within 2018-2020. Feature films must have a running time of greater than 70 minutes, while short films must not exceed 15 minutes running time. Films cannot be submitted if they have been submitted in a previous edition of the Festival.

Awards

The 38th Fajr International Film Festival offered awards at the Closing Ceremony on April 20, 2020. Awards are given for Iranian films competing in categories outlined in the FIFF Rules and Regulations, which change in monetary amount from year to year.

International
Golden Simurgh for Best Film (awarded to the film director) + 800.000.000 Iranian Rial (IRR) Cash Prize (jointly to producer and director)
Silver Simurgh for Best Director + 400.000.000 IRR Cash Prize
Silver Simurgh for Best Script + 300.000.000 IRR Cash Prize
Silver Simurgh for Best Actress
Silver Simurgh for Best Actor
In the decision of International Jury, the prize list must not contain joint awards and no film can receive more than two awards.
Silver Simurgh  for Best Short Film + 100.000.000 IRR Cash Prize (awarded to the film director)

Eastern Vista Awards
Golden Simurgh for Best Feature Film (awarded to the film director) + 600.000.000 IRR Cash Prize (jointly to producer and director)
Silver Simurgh for Best Feature Film Director + 300.000.000 IRR Cash Prize
Silver Simurgh for Best Feature Film Script + 150.000.000 IRR Cash Prize
Silver Simurgh for Special Jury Prize for Outstanding Artistic Contribution in a Feature Film in the categories of camera, editing, music score, costume or scene design
Silver Simurgh for Best Short Film + 100.000.000 IRR Cash Prize (awarded to the film director)

National Competition
 Crystal Simorgh for Best Film
 Crystal Simorgh for Best Director
 Crystal Simorgh for Best Screenplay
 Crystal Simorgh for Best Actor
 Crystal Simorgh for Best Actress
 Crystal Simorgh for Best Cinematography
 Crystal Simorgh for Best Editor
 Crystal Simorgh for Best Original Score
 Crystal Simorgh for Best Makeup
 Crystal Simorgh for Best Supporting Actor
 Crystal Simorgh for Best Supporting Actress
 Crystal Simorgh for Best Sound Recording
 Crystal Simorgh for Best Sound Effects
 Crystal Simorgh for Best Production Design
 Crystal Simorgh for Best Costume Design
 Crystal Simorgh for Best Special Effects
 Crystal Simorgh for Best Visual Effects
 Crystal Simorgh for Best National Film
 Crystal Simorgh of Special Jury Prize
 Crystal Simorgh for Audience Choice of Best Film

Other awards

For all:
Golden Tablet
Diploma Honorary
Golden Flag

Single:
Audience Award
Golden Banner
Inter-Faith
Abbas Kiarostami Award

Competitions

 Competition of Asian Cinema
 Competition of Spiritual Cinema
 International Competition
 International Competition of Short Films
 International Competition of Documentary Works
 Competition of Iranian Cinema
 Competition of Iranian Short Film
 Competition of Documentary Works

Juries
 International Competition Jury
 Competition of Spiritual Cinema Jury
 Competition of Asian Cinema Jury

Record holders

• Crystal Simorgh for Best Film : Ebrahim Hatamikia 

(Wins : 5)

• Crystal Simorgh for Best Director :  Majid Majidi   

(Wins : 4)

• Crystal Simorgh for Best Screenplay : Kambozia Partovi 

(Wins : 4)

• Crystal Simorgh for Best Cinematography : Mahmoud Kalari

(Wins : 4)

• Crystal Simorgh for Best Actor : Parviz Parastouei 

(Wins : 4)

• Crystal Simorgh for Best Actress : Hedieh Tehrani, Leila Hatami, Baran Kosari, Merila Zarei, Parvaneh Masoumi, Hengameh Ghaziani, Fatemeh Motamed-Arya 

(Wins : 2)

Fajr International Film Festival editions

 1st Fajr International Film Festival (1–11 February 1983)
 2nd Fajr International Film Festival (1–11 February 1984)
 3rd Fajr International Film Festival (1–11 February 1985)
 4th Fajr International Film Festival (1–11 February 1986)
 5th Fajr International Film Festival (2–12 February 1987)
 6th Fajr International Film Festival (1–11 February 1988)
 7th Fajr International Film Festival (1–11 February 1989)
 8th Fajr International Film Festival (1–11 February 1990)
 9th Fajr International Film Festival (1–11 February 1991)
 10th Fajr International Film Festival (1–11 February 1992)
 11th Fajr International Film Festival (1–11 February 1993)
 12th Fajr International Film Festival (1–11 February 1994)
 13th Fajr International Film Festival (1–11 February 1995)
 14th Fajr International Film Festival (1–11 February 1996)
 15th Fajr International Film Festival (1–11 February 1997)
 16th Fajr International Film Festival (1–11 February 1998)
 17th Fajr International Film Festival (1–11 February 1999)
 18th Fajr International Film Festival (1–11 February 2000)
 19th Fajr International Film Festival (1–11 February 2001)
 20th Fajr International Film Festival (1–11 February 2002)
 21st Fajr International Film Festival (1–11 February 2003)
 22nd Fajr International Film Festival (1–11 February 2004)
 23rd Fajr International Film Festival (1–11 February 2005)
 24th Fajr International Film Festival (20–30 January 2006)
 25th Fajr International Film Festival (1–11 February 2007)
 26th Fajr International Film Festival (1–11 February 2008)
 27th Fajr International Film Festival (31 January–10 February 2009)
 28th Fajr International Film Festival (1–11 February 2010)
 29th Fajr International Film Festival (1–11 February 2011)
 30th Fajr International Film Festival (1–11 February 2012)
 31st Fajr International Film Festival (1–11 February 2013)
 32nd Fajr International Film Festival (1–11 February 2014)
 33rd Fajr International Film Festival (1–11 February 2015)
 2016
 34th Fajr Film Festival (1–11 February 2016)
 34th Fajr International Film Festival (20–25 April 2016)
 2017
 35th Fajr Film Festival (1–11 February 2017)
 35th Fajr International Film Festival (21–28 April 2017)
 2018
 36th Fajr Film Festival (1–11 February 2018)
 36th Fajr International Film Festival (19–27 April 2018)
 2019
 37th Fajr Film Festival (1–11 February 2019)
 37th Fajr International Film Festival (18–26 April 2019)
 2020
 38th Fajr Film Festival (1–11 February 2020)
 38th Fajr International Film Festival (16–24 April 2020)
2021
 39th Fajr Film Festival (1–11 February 2021)
38th Fajr International Film Festival (26 May–2 June 2021)
2022
 40th Fajr Film Festival (1–11 February 2022)

Visitors 

Over the years the Festival has had numerous film figures attend, some of whom have worked closely with the festival as jury members. These include: Volker Schlondorff, Krzysztof Zanussi, Robert Chartoff, Semih Kaplanoglu, Bruce Beresford, Percy Adlon, Paul Cox, Shyam Benegal, Bela Tarr, Jan Troell, Helma Sanders-Brahms, Elia Suleiman, Agnieszka Holland, Andrey Zvyagintsev, Rustam Ibragimbekov and Costa-Gavras.

Boycotts 
Two Italian film directors, Eugenio Barba and Romeo Castellucci, have announced that they will not be attending the 2020 Fajr Festival in Tehran. They made this decision at the request of some Iranian artists who have already boycotted the festival. So far, 139 people, including director Masoud Kimiai and various movie stars are boycotting the festival in a show of sympathy for the families of those killed in the January 2020 Iranian downing of a Ukrainian passenger flight.

See also 
 Fajr decade

Notes

References

External links 

 
 
 

 
Film festivals established in 1982
1982 establishments in Iran
Winter events in Iran
Crystal Simorgh